Ignite (Ignite Talks) is a series of events where speakers have five minutes to talk on a subject accompanied by 20 slides, for 15 seconds each, automatically advanced. Ignite started in Seattle, and it has spread to 350+ organizing teams in cities, universities, governments and companies who have hosted thousands of events.

Ignite Talks is similar in its form to PechaKucha, a format founded 3 years earlier.

The first Ignite was held in 2006 in Seattle, Washington by Brady Forrest and Bre Pettis, and was sponsored by O'Reilly Media and MAKE magazine. O'Reilly continued to support Ignite until November 2015 when the franchise was handed off to its founder, Brady Forrest, who formed Ignite Talks, PBC - a Public Benefit Corporation. Ignite Talks PBC was formed to be an independent organization focusing on supporting Ignite events around the world and promoting public speaking.

References

External links
 

Public speaking organizations
Entertainment events in the United States
Technology events
O'Reilly Media